Sir Francis Theodore Page Burt  (14 June 1918 – 8 September 2004) was an Australian jurist who served as the 11th Chief Justice of Western Australia, from 1977 to 1988, and the 27th Governor of Western Australia, from 1990 to 1993.

Burt was born in Cottesloe, a suburb of Perth Western Australia, and educated at Guildford Grammar School. He studied law at the University of Western Australia, and also served in the Royal Australian Navy and the Royal Australian Air Force during the Second World War. Burt was made a justice of the Supreme Court of Western Australia in 1969, and was promoted to Chief Justice in 1977. As Chief Justice, he served as lieutenant-governor. When the Governor of Western Australia, Gordon Reid, resigned in 1989, Burt was appointed to succeed him and served as governor until 1993.

Biography
Born in Mosman Park, Western Australia, Burt's great-grandfather, Sir Archibald Burt, was Chief Justice of Western Australia from 1861 to 1879, while his grandfather, Septimus Burt, was Attorney-General and Agent-General when responsible government was granted to Western Australia in December 1890. Archibald Burt had been a slaveholder in the West Indies. Burt was educated at Guildford Grammar School and later studied law at the University of Western Australia. During the Second World War he served in the Royal Australian Navy and the Royal Australian Air Force.

After being admitted to the Bar in 1941, Burt gained his skills as a Queen's Counsel in 1959, and in 1961 founded the independent Bar in Western Australia. With others, he established Bar Chambers in 1962. He was appointed as a Justice of the Supreme Court of Western Australia in 1969, a position he held until 1977 when he was promoted to Chief Justice of Western Australia. He retired in 1988.

Burt was afforded a state funeral on his death in 2004. He is buried at Karrakatta Cemetery. The Francis Burt Chambers located in Allendale Square, Perth, and the Francis Burt Law Education Centre and Museum in Stirling Gardens are both named in his honour.

References

1918 births
2004 deaths
Australian jurists
Royal Australian Air Force officers
Australian King's Counsel
Burials at Karrakatta Cemetery
Chief Justices of Western Australia
Judges of the Supreme Court of Western Australia
Companions of the Order of Australia
Governors of Western Australia
Australian Knights Commander of the Order of St Michael and St George
People educated at Guildford Grammar School
Royal Australian Air Force personnel of World War II
Royal Australian Navy personnel of World War II
20th-century King's Counsel
University of Western Australia alumni